Elections to Barnsley Metropolitan Borough Council were held on 3 May 1984, with one third of the council up for election. Prior to the election, a Residents councillor in Dudsworth had defected to Labour. The election resulted in Labour retaining control of the council.

Election result

This resulted in the following composition of the council:

Ward results

+/- figures represent changes from the last time these wards were contested.

By-elections between 1984 and 1986

References

1984 English local elections
1984
1980s in South Yorkshire